Alfred Hauge (17 October 1915 – 31 October 1986) was a Norwegian educator, journalist, novelist, poet and historian. He wrote extensively about life on the Ryfylke islands and about Norwegian-American emigration.

Biography
Hauge was born and grew up on the island of  Kyrkjøy  in Sjernarøy, part of Finnøy municipality in Rogaland County, Norway. He was the son of Kolbein Andersson Hauge (1889–1972) and Marianne Rasmusdotter Auglænd (1893–1967). His brother Kolbjørn Hauge (1926-2007)  was a schoolteacher and author.
He completed  primary school at Bryne in Time and graduated artium at Voss  in Hordaland during 1935.  He obtained his teaching degree at Oslo in 1939. He worked as a teacher at Karmøy in Rogaland and at Stavern in Vestfold until 1945. From 1952-53, he was the Rector of the Ryfylke Folkehøgskule at Sand in Hedmark. From  1953-83, he was a journalist at Stavanger Aftenblad.

Hauge debuted with the historical novel Septemberfrost in 1941. 
Hauge is best known for describing the life and adventures of Cleng Peerson, a pioneer Norwegian immigrant to the United States in the 1820s. His trilogy included:  Hundevakt (1961; "Midwatch”), Landkjenning (1964; "Land Sighting"), and Ankerfeste (1965; “Anchoring”). This collected work was published as Cleng Peerson in Norway during 1968. An English-language version was translated by Eric J. Friis  and published under the same title during 1975. This publication was released as one of the official publications of the Norwegian Immigration Sesquicentennial in 1975.

Hauge received numerous literary awards during his career. In 1955, Hauge won the Gyldendal's Endowment, a literature prize which was awarded by the Norwegian publisher Gyldendal Norsk Forlag. In recognition of his work he was also awarded the Norwegian Critics Prize for Literature in 1965.
Hauge was made a Knight 1st Class  the Order of St. Olav  in 1976. He received an honorary doctorate at Luther College at Decorah, Iowa in 1982.

A memorial to Hauge has been erected  on the island of Kyrkjøy at Sjernarøy Church (Sjernarøy kirke).
The memorial is a bust made by artist Svein Magnus Håvarstein (1942–2013).   Sjernarøy Church  is an historic wooden church which dates to 1636.

Composer Hallvard Johnsen (1916-2003) wrote an opera based upon Alfred Hauge's Legenden om Svein og Maria. The opera was first performed on 3 September 1973 by the Norwegian National Opera and Ballet (Den Norske Opera & Ballet) in Oslo.

Selected works
 Septemberfrost: eit folkelivsbilete frå åra 1812-14 (1941)
 Skyer i drift over vårgrønt land (1945); collection of poetry
 Hans Nielsen Hauge: Guds vandringsmann (1947)
 Tuntreet blør (1953); novel
 Kvinner på Galgebakken (1958); novel
 Cleng Peerson: hundevakt (1961) novel (Part I of Cleng Peerson- trilogy)
 Cleng Peerson: landkjenning (1961) novel (Part II of Cleng Peerson- trilogy)
 Gå vest - gjennom Amerika i emigrantspor (1963) A travel sketch illustrated by Henry Imsland
 Cleng Peerson: ankerfeste. (1965) (Part III of Cleng Peerson- trilogy)
 Mysterium (1967) novel
 Cleng Peerson: utvandring (1968) drama written in collaboration with Asbjørn Toms.
 Det evige sekund (1970) collection of poetry
 Evangelium (1977) collection of poetry
 Barndom (1975) personal recollections
 Ungdom (1977) personal recollections
 Flinta-Lars: det gamle Jæren i tradisjon og folkeminne (1985) folk memories
 Gamle Jæren: andre boka om tradisjon og folkeminne etter Lars A. Tjøtta (1986) folk memories
 Manndom. Livsminne (1999), manuscript published postmortem by Alfred Hauge’s family in cooperation with the publisher Gyldendal

Awards
Melsom Prize - 1949
Gyldendal's Endowment - 1955
Sunnmørsprisen - 1958 (for Kvinner på Galgebakken)
Norwegian Critics Prize for Literature - 1965  (for the Cleng Peerson trilogy)
Sokneprest Alfred Andersson-Ryssts fond - 1974
Nynorsk Literature Prize - 1984  (for Serafen)

References

Other sources
 Pedersen, Odd Kvaal (1985) Gråstein og lengsel : peilinger i Alfred Hauges tema og litterære landskap (Oslo : Gyldendal Norsk Forlag)   
 Sørbø, Jan Inge (2001)  Angen av bork og ein brennande einerbusk. Om Alfred Hauges forfattarskap, Oslo   
 Aano, Jacob (2000)  Helsing Alfred : eit blikk på norsk kultur gjennom Alfred Hauge sine brev'', Oslo

External links
“Norwegian Opera & Ballet - Official Website”
“Cleng Peerson. Stavanger u.a. Univ.-Forl. 1983 .WorldCat.”
“Sjernarøy kirke”

1915 births
1986 deaths
People from Finnøy
Norwegian educators
20th-century Norwegian writers
20th-century Norwegian male writers
Norwegian Critics Prize for Literature winners
Recipients of the St. Olav's Medal
20th-century Norwegian journalists